Chief Funmilayo Ransome-Kuti, MON ( /ˌfʊnmiˈlaɪjoʊ ˈrænsəm ˈkuːti/; born Frances Abigail Olufunmilayo Thomas; 25 October 190013 April 1978), also known as Funmilayo Anikulapo-Kuti, was a Nigerian educator, political campaigner, suffragist, and women's rights activist.

Fumilayo Ransome Kuti was born in Abeokuta, Ogun State, Nigeria, and was the first female student to attend the Abeokuta Grammar School. As a young adult, she worked as a teacher, organizing some of the first preschool classes in the country and arranging literacy classes for lower-income women.

During the 1940s, Ransome-Kuti established the Abeokuta Women’s Union and advocated for women’s rights, demanding better representation of women in local governing bodies and an end to unfair taxes on market women. Described by media as the "Lioness of Lisabi", she led marches and protests of up to 10,000 women, forcing the ruling Alake to temporarily abdicate in 1949. As Ransome-Kuti’s political influence grew, she took part in the Nigerian independence movement, attending conferences and joining overseas delegations to discuss proposed national constitutions. Spearheading the creation of the Nigerian Women’s Union and the Federation of Nigerian Women’s Societies, she advocated for Nigerian women’s right to vote and became a noted member of international peace and women's rights movements.

Ransome-Kuti received the Lenin Peace Prize and was awarded membership in the Order of the Niger for her work. In her later years, she supported her sons' criticism of Nigeria's military governments. She died at the age of 77 after being wounded in a military raid on family property. Ransome-Kuti's children included the musician Fela Kuti, doctor and activist Beko Ransome-Kuti, and health minister Olikoye Ransome-Kuti.

Early life and education
Frances Abigail Olufunmilayo Olufela Folorunso Thomas was born on 25 October 1900 in Abeokuta, Ogun State, Nigeria, to Chief Daniel Olumeyuwa Thomas (1869–1954), a member of the aristocratic Jibolu-Taiwo family, and Lucretia Phyllis Omoyeni Adeosolu (1874–1956). Her father farmed and traded palm produce, and her mother worked as a dressmaker. Frances' father was born to Ebenezer Sobowale Thomas, who was himself born in Freetown, Sierra Leone, and Abigail Fakemi, who was born in the Yoruba town of Ilesa. Frances' oldest known paternal ancestor was her paternal great-grandmother, Sarah Taiwo (mother of Ebenezer Sobowale Thomas), a Yoruba woman who had been captured by slave traders in the early 19th century before eventually returning home to her family in Abeokuta. Sarah's first husband was Sobowale Thomas. Sarah's descendants through Thomas and her other two husbands - the Jibolu-Taiwos - became some of the first Christians in the area, and had a large influence on the growth of Christianity in Abeokuta.

Frances' mother was born to Isaac Adeosolu, who was from Abeokuta, and Harriet, the daughter of Adeboye, who was from the ancient Yoruba town of Ile-Ife. Her parents married in 1897, and they had two children who died in infancy before Frances was born.

Although it was uncommon at the time for Nigerian families to invest in much education for girls, Frances' parents believed in the importance of education for both boys and girls. She attended Abeokuta Grammar School for her secondary education. The school had initially been open only to male students, but it admitted its first female students in 1914, and Frances was first among the six girls registered for study that year. From 1919 to 1922, she went abroad and attended a finishing school for girls in Cheshire, England, where she learned elocution, music, dressmaking, French, and various domestic skills. It was there that she made the permanent decision to use her shortened Yoruba name, Funmilayo, instead of her Christian name Frances, likely in response to personal experiences of racism in England. Afterwards, she returned to Abeokuta and worked as a teacher.

On 20 January 1925, Funmilayo married Reverend Israel Oludotun Ransome-Kuti, a member of the Ransome-Kuti family. Israel had studied at the Abeokuta Grammar School several years ahead of Funmilayo, and while she was still in school the two had developed a friendship followed by a courtship. Israel found work as a school principal, and he strongly believed in bringing people together and overcoming ethnic and regional divisions. He later became a co-founder of both the Nigeria Union of Teachers and of the Nigerian Union of Students. His marriage with Funmilayo would last 30 years – until Israel's death – and was marked by a sense of equality and deep mutual respect between the couple.

After marriage, Funmilayo Ransome-Kuti had quit her old job as a teacher, but she soon found other projects. In 1928 she established one of the first preschool classes in Nigeria. Around the same time, she started a club for young women of elite families to encourage their "self-improvement", while also organizing classes for illiterate women. Between 1935 and 1936, the couple arranged to purchase a secondhand car and had it shipped to them from England. Ransome-Kuti was the first woman in Abeokuta to drive a car.

Ransome-Kuti and her husband had four children: a daughter named Dolupo (1926) and sons Olikoye "Koye" (1927), Olufela "Fela" (1938), and Bekololari "Beko" (1940).

Activism

Abeokuta Women's Union  
In 1932, Ransome-Kuti had helped establish the Abeokuta Ladies Club. The club focused on charity work, sewing, catering and adult education classes, and its early members were mostly Christian, Western-educated women from the middle class. By the 1940s, however, the club was moving in a more political direction. Inspired by an illiterate friend who asked her for help learning how to read, Ransome-Kuti began organizing literacy workshops for market women through the club, and she subsequently gained a greater understanding of social and political inequalities faced by many Nigerian women. Writing about the freedoms granted by her own more privileged background, Ransome-Kuti noted that "the true position of Nigerian women had to be judged from the women who carried babies on their backs and farmed from sunrise to sunset … not women who used tea, sugar, and flour for breakfast". In 1944 she developed a successful campaign to stop local authorities seizing rice from market women under false pretenses.

In 1946 the club was formally renamed the Abeokuta Women's Union (AWU), now open to all women in Abeokuta. The organisation now turned its focus to fighting unfair price controls and taxes imposed on market women, with Ransome-Kuti as the AWU's president. She had founded the union along with Grace Eniola Soyinka (her husband's niece and the mother of Nobel Laureate Wole Soyinka), and the AWU gradually grew to represent 20,000 official members, with up to 100,000 additional supporters. In an effort to unify women and avoid class conflict, Ransome-Kuti and other formally educated members spoke Yoruba and wore traditional Yoruba clothing to union meetings and events.

Ransome-Kuti's first well-known political activity came when she led the AWU in a protest against a tax on women. In Abeokuta, alongside regular taxes for income and water usage, market women were also forced to pay a special tax that went directly to market supervisors or "parakoyis". The Alake Ademola II, a local traditional ruler of Abeokuta who now became part of the colonial administration via indirect rule, had imposed taxes on women after the Egba Native Administration had been established in 1914. After a failed appeal to British authorities to remove the current Alake from power and halt the tax, Ransome-Kuti and the AWU began contacting newspapers and circulating petitions. Aiming to put more pressure on authorities, AWU members publicly refused to pay their taxes, staged long vigils outside the Alake's palace, and arranged an audit of the Sole Native Authority System (SNA) finance records. Along with their objective of ending the tax on women, they demanded representation for women on the SNA's executive council.

By late 1947, Abeokuta authorities began forbidding women from organizing parades or demonstrations, denying them the necessary permits. Undeterred, Ransome-Kuti and her fellow organisers declared that they were planning "picnics" and "festivals" instead, drawing up to 10,000 participants to their demonstrations – some of which involved altercations with police. Ransome-Kuti trained women in how to deal with the tear gas canisters sometimes thrown at them, and the AWU used its membership dues to fund legal representation for arrested members. According to one story, when a British district officer shouted at Ransome-Kuti to shut her women up, she responded "You may have been born, but you were not bred! Would you speak to your mother like that?" The West African Pilot described her as the "Lioness of Lisabi".

Tensions between AWU protesters and authorities came to a head in February 1948 when the Alake compared AWU women to "vipers that could not be tamed" and banned Ransome-Kuti from entering the palace for political meetings. Immediately afterwards, AWU members blocked the palace entrance and refused to let the visiting British district officer leave. The incident concluded with a scuffle when Ransome-Kuti grabbed hold of the steering wheel of the district officer's car and refused to let go "until he pried her hand loose". Public sympathy grew in support of the women. Throughout early 1948, AWU members continued to protest the tax, fighting with petitions, press conferences, letters to newspapers, and demonstrations. After more demonstrations in late April of that year, the Alake finally responded to the women's demands, suspending the tax on women and appointing a special committee to look into the AWU's complaints.

In early 1949, the AWU's efforts led to the temporary abdication of the Alake. Newspapers across Nigeria published stories about the event, and Ransome-Kuti's work with the AWU became widely publicised.

National work  
In 1947, the National Council of Nigeria and the Cameroons party (NCNC) sent a delegation to London, England, to protest a proposed Nigerian constitution. Ransome-Kuti was the sole woman in the delegation. While in London, Ransome-Kuti gave speeches about Nigerian women's issues at the London Women's Parliamentary Committee, the National Federation of Women's Institutes, and other organizations. She also caused a stir after writing an article for the Daily Worker that argued colonial rule had "severely marginalized" Nigerian women both politically and economically. When a Western Provinces conference was held in Nigeria in 1949 to discuss a new national constitution, Ransome-Kuti represented Abeokuta and was once again the only woman involved in the discussions. She made strong arguments for the inclusion of women's enfranchisement and against the creation of an indirect electoral system.

In May 1949, Ransome-Kuti proposed the creation of the Nigerian Women's Union (NWU) in order to better support women's rights and enfranchisement across the country. The AWU supported her proposal, and the organisation subsequently became the Abeokuta branch of the NWU. Over the next several years, Ransome-Kuti travelled widely to help set up NWU branches in towns and cities all over Nigeria. She served as president of both the NWU and her hometown union in Abeokuta. The NWU pursued goals of achieving women's suffrage, dismantling electoral colleges, and supporting a more balanced representation of women in politics.

Ransome-Kuti was a founding member of the NCNC party, and in 1951 she ran as an NCNC candidate for the regional assembly but was unsuccessful, in part because a special tax requirement for voters meant that many of her supporters – particularly women – were disqualified from participating. She acted as treasurer for the NCNC Western Working Committee and later President of the NCNC Women's Organization in the Western Region.

In 1953, Ransome-Kuti organized a conference in Abeokuta to discuss women's suffrage and political representation, and 400 women delegates attended the two-day event. The participants subsequently formed the Federation of Nigerian Women's Societies (FNWS). The FNWS campaigned for women's political inclusion, improved educational opportunities, and the creation of new social services and healthcare.

During the early 1950s, Ransome-Kuti was appointed to the Western House of Chiefs and granted the chieftaincy title of Oloye of the Yoruba people. She was the first woman appointed to the Western House and one of the few women to have a position in any Nigerian House of Chiefs at the time. She also served as a board member for the Nigerian Union of Teachers.

Travel bans and independence  
On 6 April 1955, Israel Ransome-Kuti died from prostate cancer after an extended period of illness. Funmilayo was hit hard by the loss of her husband, having struggled over the past several years with the question of whether to abandon her political work in order to spend more time with him. Over the next two decades, alongside her political work, Ransome-Kuti began investing time and money to establish new schools throughout Abeokuta – a project that arose from the deep belief in the importance of education and literacy that both she and her husband had shared.

Ransome-Kuti continued to travel widely. On the African continent, she developed strong ties with Algerian, Egyptian, and Ghanaian women's organisations, and her visits further abroad included trips to England, China, the Soviet Union, Switzerland, Austria, Czechoslovakia, and Poland.

On a visit to China in 1956, Ransome-Kuti gave public lectures on Nigerian women and culture and met Mao Zedong. Ransome-Kuti believed in a number of socialist ideals, defining herself as an "African Socialist"; although she did not consider herself a communist, she was "not frightened or repelled by communism either". Because she had visited China with the financial assistance of the Women's International Democratic Federation (WIDF), however, Ransome-Kuti attracted the attention of British authorities who feared the WIDF had recruited her to spread communist ideologies. Her passport renewal was denied the following year. In 1958, when Ransome-Kuti was invited to attend a women's rights conference in the United States, she was denied an American visa because authorities felt "she had too many Communist connections". Although Ransome-Kuti received support from high-profile friends and wrote letters of protest to government officials, even holding a press conference to declare that she was not a communist, her protests were ignored. It was not until Nigeria became independent in 1960 that Ransome-Kuti's passport was renewed.

In 1959, when Ransome-Kuti was denied a second chance to run as an NCNC candidate, she ran as an independent candidate instead, but her campaign split the vote and helped an opponent of the NCNC win the seat. Afterwards, the party revoked Ransome-Kuti's membership. She went on to found a political party, the Commoners' People's Party, but the party failed to gain momentum, dissolving after only a year. Around this time, Ransome-Kuti's political rivals created the National Council of Women's Societies in an attempt to replace the FNWS.

After independence in 1960, Nigeria introduced universal adult suffrage for both men and women through its new constitution. The Northern Region of Nigeria, which was a primarily Muslim region, did not immediately implement voting rights for women (although women's suffrage in the region was later granted by military decree in 1976).

Nigeria's early years of independence became mired in political disagreements between leaders and representatives. When a 1966 military coup brought a change of power, Ransome-Kuti felt that this was a positive and necessary step forward for the country, but she condemned the violence that followed after the counter-coup that same year. She was actively involved with the Women's International League for Peace and Freedom (WILPF), being president for the organization's Nigerian branch since 1963.

In 1965, Ransome-Kuti received the national honour of membership in the Order of the Niger. The University of Ibadan bestowed an honorary doctorate of laws upon her in 1968, and she received the Lenin Peace Prize in 1970.

In 1969, Ransome-Kuti was appointed chairman of the Advisory Board of Education by the western Nigeria state government, and she served as a consultant to the Federal Ministry of Education on recruitment of teachers from other countries.

Inspired by her son Fela, who had altered his surname to reflect a discarding of colonial European influences, Ransome-Kuti informally changed her surname to "Anikulapo-Kuti" during the early 1970s. The name "Anikulapo" is a Yoruba word and can be translated to mean "hunter who carries death in a pouch" or "warrior who carries strong protection".

Death

In the later years of Anikulapo-Kuti's life, her son Fela, a musician and activist, became known for his vocal criticisms of Nigerian military governments. Fela had been arrested and briefly imprisoned during the early 1970s, and authorities had raided his home and properties several times. To show his disdain for the Federation of Nigeria's authority, he named his home property "the Kalakuta Republic" and transformed it into a commune where friends and supporters could gather and spend time without fear of the military authorities. In November 1974, Nigerian police raided his nightclub in town with axes and tear gas, leaving Fela with injuries. In 1976, Fela released an album called Zombie, in which he compared the army to mindless machines, and many believe that this album acted as a final straw in the conflict between Fela and the government.

Anikulapo-Kuti often visited her son at his compound, and she was there on 18 February 1977 when close to 1,000 armed soldiers surrounded and stormed the property. As soon as the soldiers broke inside they began destroying property and assaulting the residents. Fela and Bekolari were beaten and severely injured. Anikulapo-Kuti was thrown from a second-floor window. Following the attack, she was hospitalized and eventually lapsed into a coma. She died on 13 April 1978 as a result of her injuries.

Anikulapo-Kuti's remains were interred in Abeokuta in the same vault as her husband. Her funeral services were attended by thousands, and many market women and traders shut down shops and markets across the city to mark her death. Major Nigerian news outlets published eulogies, naming the activist "a progressive revolutionary" and "a Pan-African visionary".

On the one-year anniversary of Anikulapo-Kuti's death, Fela took a coffin and travelled nearly 20 kilometres to Dodan Barracks in Lagos (then Nigeria's Supreme Military Headquarters), leaving the coffin at the gate in an attempt to shame the government. The invasion, her death, and the movement of the coffin is detailed in his song "Coffin for Head of State".

Legacy 
Biographer Cheryl Johnson-Odim notes that Funmilayo Ransome-Kuti's name remains well known throughout Nigeria and that "no other Nigerian woman of her time ranked as such a national figure or had [such] international exposure and connections". Nigerian activist Hajiya Gambo and politician Margaret Ekpo both named Ransome-Kuti as a strong influence on their work, and Nigerian-British feminist writer Amina Mama has cited Ransome-Kuti's activism as having shaped her personal beliefs and perspectives. Ghanaian politician Kwame Nkrumah (later the first Prime Minister of Ghana) was heavily inspired by Ransome-Kuti in his early organizing of the Ghana Women's Association.

In 2012, the Nigerian government proposed the inclusion of Ransome-Kuti's image on the new N5000 currency note. In August of that year, Ransome-Kuti's grandson, musician Seun Kuti, stated to media that he found the proposal "ludicrous to say the least", in light of the government's role in his grandmother's death. Kuti said that his family had never received an apology for the assault on their compound, with official government statements declaring that Ransome-Kuti had been attacked by "1000 unknown soldiers".

Ransome-Kuti was portrayed in the 2014 film October 1 by actress Deola Sagoe. On 25 October 2019, Ransome-Kuti was posthumously honored with a Google Doodle created by Nigerian-Italian illustrator Diana Ejaita.

See also 
 List of suffragists and suffragettes

References

Further reading 
Byfield, Judith A. (2003). "Taxation, Women, and the Colonial State: Egba Women's Tax Revolt". Meridians 3 (2).

External links

Funmilayo Ransome-Kuti and the Women's Union of Abeokuta. Illustrations by Alaba Onajin, script and text by Obioma Ofoego, UNESCO, 2014
Silent film of Funmilayo Ransome-Kuti and other Nigerian chiefs in London, England on YouTube

1900 births
1978 deaths
Saro people
Politicians from Abeokuta
Nigerian women educators
Yoruba women educators
Yoruba women activists
Nigerian women's rights activists
Nigerian women activists
Deaths by defenestration
Ransome-Kuti family
20th-century Nigerian politicians
Nigerian feminists
Lenin Peace Prize recipients
Nigerian royalty
Yoruba royalty
Members of the Order of the Niger
Nigerian suffragists
People from colonial Nigeria
Nigerian schoolteachers
Violence against women in Nigeria
Yoruba women in politics
History of women in Nigeria
20th-century Nigerian women politicians
History of Abeokuta
20th-century Nigerian educators
20th-century Nigerian women
Founders of Nigerian schools and colleges
Nigerian Christian socialists
Socialist feminists
20th-century women educators
People educated at Abeokuta Grammar School